Medialink is a Hong Kong-based corporation that specializes in licensing anime for South and Southeast Asia.

Medialink may also refer to:
MediaLink, a company founded by Michael Kassan that focuses on business to business services
Media Link (TV Broadcaster), a Bulgarian TV broadcaster
Media.link Communications, a Maltian mass media corporation